Walden Abbey was a Benedictine monastery in Saffron Walden, Essex, England founded by Geoffrey de Mandeville, 1st Earl of Essex between 1136 and 1143.  Originally a priory, it was elevated to the status of an abbey in 1190.

Soon after its founding, Earl Geoffrey was arrested by King Stephen.  When released on surrender of his castles, the earl launched a rebellion that lasted over a year.  When he was killed, he had also been excommunicated and could not be buried at the priory.  Walden suffered without a clear patron through the rest of Stephen's reign.  Even when Geoffrey de Mandeville, 2nd Earl of Essex regained his father's title and lands under King Henry II, he did little to assist his father's foundation.  Nonetheless, when he died in 1166, his body was taken to Walden Priory for burial despite a suggestion that his mother Rohese de Vere, Countess of Essex, send her men to seize her son's body and have it buried in the monastery she had founded at Chicksands.

Walden's relations with Geoffrey's brother and heir William de Mandeville, 3rd Earl of Essex were slightly better, although the member of the community who wrote the Book of the Foundation of Walden claimed that Countess Rohese turned him against Walden.  On his death in 1189, the monastery was again left without a clear patron for a number of years.  The earldom of Essex eventually passed to the husband of a distant cousin of earl William, Geoffrey fitz Peter, along with the patronage of Walden and the Mandeville lands and titles.  The monks quarreled with him, however.

The abbey eventually came under the patronage of the Duchy of Lancaster in the later Middle Ages, and thus passed to the crown in 1399.

After the dissolution of Walden during the reign of Henry VIII, the abbey property was purchased by Sir Thomas Audley, who built his house Audley End there.  The current Jacobean mansion was built for his grandson, Thomas Howard, 1st Earl of Suffolk, however.

Burials at the Abbey (some in the Priory preceding)
Geoffrey de Mandeville, 2nd Earl of Essex
Thomas Audley, 1st Baron Audley of Walden
Humphrey de Bohun, 3rd Earl of Hereford
Joan de Bohun, Countess of Hereford
Elizabeth of Rhuddlan, Countess of Hereford, daughter or Edward I of England
Humphrey de Bohun, 7th Earl of Hereford
Thomas Howard, 1st Earl of Suffolk
Theophilus Howard, 2nd Earl of Suffolk (in the Howard Vault)
James Howard, 3rd Earl of Suffolk (in the Howard Vault)
William de Bohun, 1st Earl of Northampton
Humphrey, 2nd Earl of Buckingham
Henry Howard, 6th Earl of Suffolk, his wife, Auberie Anne Penelope O'Brien, and his second wife Henrietta (in the Howard Vault)
Charles Howard, 7th Earl of Suffolk and his wife, Arabella Astry Howard (in the Howard Vault)
Charles Howard, 9th Earl of Suffolk (in the Howard Vault)

References

See also
List of monastic houses in Essex

Monasteries in Essex
Benedictine monasteries in England
Burial sites of the Bohun family